{{Infobox person
| name               = Wes Craven
| image              = Wes Craven 2010.jpg
| caption            = Craven in 2010
| birth_name         = Wesley Earl Craven
| birth_date         = 
| birth_place        = Cleveland, Ohio, U.S.
| death_date         = 
| death_place        = Los Angeles, California, U.S.
| resting_place      = Lambert's Cove CemeteryWest Tisbury, Massachusetts
| nationality        = American
| other names        = Abe SnakeGuru of GoreMaster of HorrorSultan of Shock
| occupation         = 
| alma_mater         = Wheaton CollegeJohns Hopkins University
| years_active       = 1968–2015
| spouse             = 
| children           = 2, including Jonathan
| signature          = Signature of Wes Craven.png
| known_for          = A Nightmare on Elm StreetScreamThe People Under the StairsThe Hills Have EyesThe Last House on the LeftRed EyeMusic of the HeartSwamp ThingThe Serpent and the Rainbow
}}

Wesley Earl Craven (August 2, 1939 – August 30, 2015) was an American film director, screenwriter, producer, actor, and editor. Craven has commonly been recognized as one of the greatest masters of the horror genre due to the cultural impact and influence of his work. Amongst his prolific filmography, Craven was best known for his pioneering work in the horror genre, particularly slasher films, where he mixed horror cliches with humor and satire.

Craven created the A Nightmare on Elm Street franchise (1984–2010), specifically writing and directing the first film, co-writing and producing the third, A Nightmare on Elm Street 3: Dream Warriors (1987), and writing and directing the seventh, Wes Craven's New Nightmare (1994). He additionally directed the first four films in the Scream franchise (1996–2011). He also directed cult classics The Last House on the Left (1972) and The Hills Have Eyes (1977), the horror comedy The People Under the Stairs (1991), and psychological thriller Red Eye (2005). His other notable films include Swamp Thing (1982), The Serpent and the Rainbow (1988), Shocker (1989), Vampire in Brooklyn (1995), and Music of the Heart (1999).

Craven received several accolades across his career, which includes a Scream Award, a Sitges Film Festival Award, a Fangoria Chainsaw Award, and nominations for a Saturn Award and several other film festivals. In 1995, he was honored by the Academy of Science Fiction, Fantasy and Horror Films with the Life Career Award, for his accomplishments in the horror genre. In 2012, the New York City Horror Film Festival awarded Craven the Lifetime Achievement Award.

On August 30, 2015, aged 76, Craven died of a brain tumor at his home in Los Angeles.

Early life
Craven was born in Cleveland, Ohio, the son of Caroline (née Miller) and Paul Eugene Craven. He was of English, Scottish, and German descent. He was raised in a strict Baptist family. Craven earned an undergraduate degree in English and psychology from Wheaton College in Illinois and a master's degree in philosophy and writing from Johns Hopkins University.

In 1964–65, Craven taught English at Westminster College in New Wilmington, Pennsylvania, and was a humanities professor at Clarkson College of Technology (later named Clarkson University) in Potsdam, New York. He also taught at Madrid-Waddington High School in Madrid, New York. During this time, he purchased a used 16 mm film camera and began making short movies. His friend Steve Chapin informed him of a messenger position at a New York City film production co, where his brother, future folk-rock star Harry Chapin worked. Craven moved into the building where his friend Steve Chapin lived at 136 Hicks St. in Brooklyn Heights. His first creative job in the film industry was as a sound editor.

Recalling his early training, Craven said in 1994, "Harry was a fantastic film editor and producer of industrials. He taught me the Chapin method [of editing]: 'Nuts and bolts! Nuts and bolts! Get rid of the shit!'" Craven afterward became the firm's assistant manager, and broke into film editing with You've Got to Walk It Like You Talk It or You'll Lose That Beat (1971).

Career
Craven had a letter published in the July 19, 1968, edition of Life praising the periodical's coverage of contemporary rock music and offbeat performers such as Frank Zappa. Craven left the academic world for the more lucrative role of pornographic film director. In the documentary Inside Deep Throat, Craven says on camera he made "many hardcore X-rated films" under pseudonyms. While his role in Deep Throat is undisclosed, most of his early known work involved writing, film editing, or both.

Craven's first feature film as director was The Last House on the Left, which was released in 1972. Craven expected the film to be shown at only a few theaters, which according to him "gave me a freedom to be outrageous, and to go into areas that normally I wouldn't have gone into, and not worry about my family hearing about it, or being crushed." Ultimately the movie was screened much more widely than he assumed, leaving him ostracized due to the content of the film.

After the negative experience of Last House, Craven attempted to move out of the horror genre, and began writing non-horror films with his partner Sean S. Cunningham, none of which attracted any financial backing. Finally, based on advice from a friend about the ease of filming in the Nevada deserts, Craven began to write a new horror film based on that locale. The resulting film, The Hills Have Eyes, cemented Craven as a "horror film director" with Craven noting, "It soon became clear that I wasn't going to do anything else unless it was scary".

Craven frequently collaborated with Sean S. Cunningham. In Craven's debut feature, The Last House on the Left, Cunningham served as producer. They pooled all of their resources and came up with $90,000. Later, in Craven's best-known film, A Nightmare on Elm Street (1984), Cunningham directed one of the chase scenes, although he was not credited. Craven had a hand in launching actor Johnny Depp's career by casting him in A Nightmare on Elm Street, Depp's first major film role.Elm Street villain Freddy Krueger appeared with Cunningham's Jason Voorhees in the 2003 slasher film Freddy vs. Jason, produced by Cunningham with screenwriter Victor Miller credited as "Character Creator". In the 2009 remake of The Last House on the Left, Cunningham and Craven share production credits.

Although known for directing horror/thriller films, he worked on two films which are outside this genre: Music of the Heart (1999) and Paris, je t'aime (2006) (as one of the 22 directors responsible for it). Craven designed the Halloween 2008 logo for Google and was the second celebrity personality to take over the YouTube homepage on Halloween. In the mid-1980s, Craven worked briefly in the television industry by directing seven episodes of the 1985 reboot of The Twilight Zone, include an episode that was written by George R. R. Martin.

Craven created Coming of Rage, a five-issue comic book series, with 30 Days of Night writer Steve Niles. The series was released in digital form in 2014 by Liquid Comics with a print edition scheduled for an October 2015 debut.

Filmmaking

 Influences 
Craven has cited filmmakers Ingmar Bergman, Luis Buñuel, Alfred Hitchcock, Federico Fellini, Jean Cocteau, and Francois Truffaut as among his major influences. Craven's first film, The Last House on the Left, was conceived as a remake of Bergman's The Virgin Spring (1960). The goat in the dream sequence at the beginning of A Nightmare on Elm Street was included by Craven as a homage to Buñuel.

 Style and themes 

Craven's works tend to explore the breakdown of family structures, the nature of dreams and reality, and often feature black humor and satirical elements. Ostensibly civilized families succumb to and exercise violence in The Last House on the Left and The Hills Have Eyes. A Nightmare on Elm Street, Shocker, and the Scream films address the process of addressing family trauma.

Several of Craven's films are characterized by abusive familial relationships such as The Hills Have Eyes, A Nightmare on Elm Street, The People Under the Stairs, and others. Families in denial are a common thread throughout his movies, an idea Craven openly discussed:

The blurring of the barrier between dreams and reality, sometimes called "rubber-reality", is a staple of Craven's style. A Nightmare on Elm Street, for example, dealt with the consequences of dreams in real life. The Serpent and the Rainbow and Shocker portray protagonists who cannot distinguish between nightmarish visions and reality. Following New Nightmare, Craven increasingly explored metafictional elements in his films. New Nightmare has actress Heather Langenkamp play herself as she is haunted by the villain of the film in which she once starred. At one point in the film, the audience sees on Wes Craven's word processor a script he has written, which includes the conversation he just had with Heather—as if the script were being written as the action unfolds.

In Scream, the characters frequently reference horror films similar to their situations, and at one point, Billy Loomis tells his girlfriend that life is just a big movie.  This concept was emphasized in the sequels, as copycat stalkers re-enact the events of a new film about the Woodsboro killings (Woodsboro being the fictional town where Scream is set) occurring in Scream.

 Collaborators 
Marianne Maddalena served as a producer on twelve of Craven's films. After working on Wes Craven's New Nightmare, Patrick Lussier became an editor on all of his features up to Red Eye. Craven tended to employ cinematographers Peter Deming, Mark Irwin and Jacques Haitkin on his films. With the exception of Music of the Heart, composer Marco Beltrami worked on all of Craven's films from Scream to Scream 4. Although he usually wrote his own films, Craven worked with screenwriter Kevin Williamson regularly after Scream. Craven often used a number of the same actors on his projects including Neve Campbell, Courteney Cox, David Arquette, Robert Englund, Michael Berryman, Heather Langenkamp, and David Hess.

Personal life
Craven's first marriage, to Bonnie Broecker, produced two children: Jonathan Craven (born 1965) and Jessica Craven (born 1968). Jonathan is a writer and director. Jessica was a singer-songwriter in the group the Chapin Sisters. The marriage ended in 1970.

In 1984, Craven married a woman who became known professionally as actress Mimi Craven. The two later divorced, with Wes Craven stating in interviews that the marriage dissolved after he discovered it "was no longer anything but a sham." In 2004, Craven married Iya Labunka; she frequently worked as a producer on Craven's films.

Craven was a birder; in 2010, he joined Audubon California's board of directors. His favorite films included Night of the Living Dead (1968), The Virgin Spring (1960) and Red River (1948).

Death and legacy
Craven died of a brain tumor at his home in Los Angeles on August 30, 2015, aged 76.
Many actors and fellow directors paid tribute to him, including David Arquette, Adrienne Barbeau, Angela Bassett, Bruce Campbell, Heather Langenkamp, Neve Campbell, John Carpenter, Courteney Cox, Joe Dante, Johnny Depp, Robert Englund, Sarah Michelle Gellar, Lloyd Kaufman, Jamie Kennedy, Rose McGowan, Kristy Swanson, Edgar Wright, and Amanda Wyss. The tenth episode of the horror television series Scream and the fifth film in the franchise (2022) were dedicated in his memory.

Craven was buried at the Lambert's Cove Cemetery in the town of  West Tisbury on the island of Martha’s Vineyard in Massachusetts.

 Filmography 

Bibliography

Awards and nominations

Throughout his career, Craven was nominated for and won numerous awards, including multiple Saturn Awards and several film festival honors.

In 1977, Craven won the critics award at the Sitges Film Festival for his horror film The Hills Have Eyes. In 1997, the Gérardmer Film Festival granted him the Grand Prize for the slasher film Scream''. In 2012, the New York City Horror Film Festival awarded Craven the Lifetime Achievement Award.

References

External links
 

1939 births
2015 deaths
20th-century American novelists
American male film actors
Film directors from Ohio
American male screenwriters
English-language film directors
Horror film directors
Johns Hopkins University alumni
Writers from Cleveland
Wheaton College (Illinois) alumni
Birdwatchers
Deaths from brain cancer in the United States
Screenwriters from Ohio
American atheists
American former Protestants
Film producers from Ohio
20th-century pseudonymous writers
Postmodernist filmmakers
Horror film producers
Critics of religions